The Upper Amazon Maipurean languages, a.k.a. North Amazonian or Inland Northern Maipuran, are Arawakan languages of the northern Amazon in Colombia, Venezuela, Peru, and Brazil.

Upper Amazon Arawakan has been surveyed comprehensively by Henri Ramirez (2001), which includes a historical reconstruction as well.

Languages

Kaufman (1994)
Kaufman (1994) gives the following breakdown (Aikhenvald's names of branches in parentheses):

 Western Nawiki (Colombian)
 Wainumá group (†)
 Wainumá (†)
 Mariaté (†)
 Anauyá (†)
 Piapoko group
 Achagua (Achawa)
 Piapoco
 Amarizana (†)
 Caviyari (Cabiyarí) (†?)
 Warekena group
 Guarequena (Warekena)
 Mandahuaca (Mandawaka)
 Río Negro group (†)
 Jumana (Yumana) (†)
 Pasé (†)
 Cawishana (†)
 Yucuna group
 Yucuna (Jukuna)
 Guarú (†)
 Eastern Nawiki (Upper Rio Negro)
 Tariana
 Karu group
 Kurripako (a.k.a. Ipeka-Tapuia-Curripako)
 Baniwa (of Içana) (Carútana-Baniwa)
 Katapolítani-Moriwene-Mapanai (Kadaupuritana)
 Resígaro (†?)
 Central Upper Amazon (Orinoco)
 Baré group
 Marawá (†)
 Baré
 Guinao (†)
 Yavitero group (†)
 Yavitero (†)
 Baniwa (Abane)
 Maipure (†)
 Manao (Middle Rio Negro) (†)
 Manao (†)
 Kariaí (Cariyai) (†)

He leaves the following Upper Amazon languages unclassified:
 Shiriana (Xiriâna) (†), Yabaána (†), Waraikú (Araikú) (†), Wiriná (†)

Aikhenvald (1999)
In 1999 Aikhenvald classified a couple languages Kaufman left out (Shiriana, Yabaâna), but leaves several of the Western Nawiki languages and branches unclassified. Several languages — Maipure, Resígaro, Cawishana, Mandahuaca, and Guarequena — are moved. She treats the Yucuna, Karu (Baniwa), and Bare groups as single languages.

 Western Nawiki (Colombian)
 Maipure (†)
 Resígaro (†?)
 Achagua (Achawa)
 Piapoco
 Caviyari (Cabiyarí) (†?)
 Yucuna (Jukuna) (dialect: Guarú (†))
 Eastern Nawiki (Upper Rio Negro)
 Tariana
 Baniwa (Carútana-Baniwa) (dialects: Curripako, Catapolítani)
 Guarequena (Warekena)
 Central Upper Amazon (Orinoco)
 Mandahuaca (Mandawaka)
Yabaâna (†)
Baré (dialect: Guinao (†))
 Yavitero (†)
 Baniwa of Guainia  (†)
 Manao (Middle Rio Negro) (†)
 Manao (†)
 Shiriana (Xiriâna) (†)
 Cawishana (Kaiʃana) (†)

Unclassified (†): Wainumá, Mariaté, Anauyá, Amarizana, Jumana (Yumana), Pasé, Kariaí (Cariyai), Waraikú (Araikú), Wiriná. Cabre (Cavare) was found in the area of the Western Nawiki languages, but only a few words are known. The "Ponares language" listed in Ethnologue may have been Piapoco or Achagua.

References

Ramirez, Henri. 2001. Línguas Arawak da Amazônia Setentrional. Manaus: EDUA. 745pp.

Arawakan languages
Upper Amazon